Pierre de la Vergne, aka Pierre de Veruche, Pierre Verneyo, Pierre Veruco, Pierre Verrujo or Pierre Veroche, Latin Petrus de Vernio (died 6 October 1403 in Avignon was a French cardinal.

Life 
Pierre de la Vergne studied Canon law at the University of Montpellier. He was a disciple of Johannes Klenkok and was appointed cardinal deacon by Pope Gregory XI in 1371 taking the titular church Santa Maria in Via Lata.

During the conflict about the Sachsenspiegel law book he handed the Decadicon - a written attack by Johannes Klenkok on the Sachsenspiegel - to Pope Gregory XI. Gregory considered the attack and later issued the papal bull Salvator humani generis condemning 14 articles of the Sachsenspiegel on 8 April 1374.

De la Vergne participated in the papal conclave 1378 during which Pope Urban VI was elected and later in 1378 in the papal conclave that elected Antipope Clement VII. In 1379 he joined the Roman Obedience together with the other French cardinals.

References

Bibliography 
 André Duchesne, Histoire de tous les cardinaux françois, II, pp. 633–634
 Lars Rentmeister: Das Verhältnis zwischen Staat und Kirche im späten Mittelalter am Beispiel der Diskussion um den Sachsenspiegel. Freie Universität Berlin, Berlin 2016, Dissertation FU Berlin 2016, 473 pages Volltext online PDF, 59,63 MB), pp. 265 ff.

External links 
 Salvador Miranda, The Cardinals of the Holy Roman Catholic Church:  Vergne, Pierre de

Year of birth unknown
15th-century French cardinals
University of Montpellier alumni
1403 deaths
14th-century French jurists
14th-century French cardinals